Richard Dunn (born 19 January 1945, in Halifax) is an English former heavyweight boxer who was the British (1975–76), European (1976) and Commonwealth (1975–76) Champion. He unsuccessfully challenged  Muhammad Ali for the World Heavyweight title in 1976.

Early life
Dunn played rugby in his teens and early 20s. Starting boxing as an amateur in the early 1960s, he turned professional in his mid-20s whilst continuing to work as a scaffolder, living in Bradford, West Yorkshire. He was unable to afford the expense of sparring partners to train with for most of his career, and his coach was his father-in-law. He was a soldier in the British Army, serving as a non-commissioned officer with 4th Battalion, Parachute Regiment in the 1960s-70s, being awarded the Corps' Fishmongers' Trophy in 1974.

Boxing career
A southpaw, Dunn's professional career began with a win over Cardiff fighter Del Phillips in a heavyweight eliminator competition in Mayfair, London in July 1969. His second fight was on the same day in the semi-final. It was a first-round defeat against Danny McAlinden, who dispatched all three of his opponents in under three rounds to win the competition. However, in May 1973, Dunn defeated Billy Aird on points in an eliminator for the British Heavyweight Championship at Grosvenor House in London. He lost the final eliminator against Bunny Johnson, in October, after a tenth-round knockout at the King's Hall in Manchester. However, when he faced the same opponent at the Empire Pool at Wembley for both the British and Commonwealth titles in September 1975, he prevailed on points, after 15 rounds.

British title 
He made his first defence against McAlinden two months later. However, this time it was Dunn that won with a knockout after McAlinden went down three times in the second round.

On 6 April 1976 Dunn won the European Heavyweight Title by a third-round TKO of the German boxer Bernd August at the Royal Albert Hall in London.

Title shot 
On 24 May 1976 Dunn was given the chance of fighting for the WBC and WBA titles against the American champion Muhammad Ali at the Olympic Hall in Munich, Germany. Dunn, despite fighting in a spirited fashion, found himself seriously outmatched by Ali in power and technique, being knocked down several times by the American champion, who clearly realized the un-equalness of the competition in his favour and began to land carefully timed and weighted punches to stun Dunn but minimize the chance of physical injury to him as the fight went on. At the 2:05 minute mark in the fifth round Dunn went to the floor for the final time and the referee stopped the match in a technical knock-out, with Ali playing to the crowd comically windmilling a punch that was coming that would be overwhelming, and to encourage the referee to end the match as having run its course. (This was to be the last knockout Ali achieved in his professional career).

Aftermath 
Dunn lost his next fight in London five months later with Joe Bugner, surrendering all his titles in a first-round knock-out. His final fight was a fifth-round knock-out defeat to the South African boxer Kallie Knoetze at the Ellis Park Tennis Stadium in Johannesburg on 10 September 1977, after which Dunn retired from the sport.

Dunn was the subject of This Is Your Life in 1976 when he was surprised by Eamonn Andrews just ahead of his fight with Muhammad Ali.

Post-career civic honours

The 'Richard Dunn Sports Centre' was opened by Bradford Council in Dunn's home town in 1978, named in honour of his sporting achievements. The facility was closed in November 2019, and was due to be demolished in 2020, with the Council announcing the intention to name a new road on the site after Dunn in the future. However the future of the unused leisure centre is now in doubt, after Historic England granted the building Grade II listed status, following an appeal by the Twentieth Century Society.

Later life
After his sports career, having lost money in a failed hotel venture, Dunn lived in Scarborough, North Yorkshire with his wife Janet and three children, returning to work as a scaffolder. He was seriously injured in 1989 on an oil rig in the North Sea after a 40 ft fall which broke both of his legs. In retirement he lives in Scarborough, where he has been associated with charity work for Parkinson's UK and is the honorary president of the town's amateur boxing club.

Professional boxing record

|-
|align="center" colspan=8|33 Wins (16 knockouts, 17 decisions), 12 Losses (11 knockouts, 1 decision) 
|-
| align="center" style="border-style: none none solid solid; background: #e3e3e3"|Result
| align="center" style="border-style: none none solid solid; background: #e3e3e3"|Record
| align="center" style="border-style: none none solid solid; background: #e3e3e3"|Opponent
| align="center" style="border-style: none none solid solid; background: #e3e3e3"|Type
| align="center" style="border-style: none none solid solid; background: #e3e3e3"|Round
| align="center" style="border-style: none none solid solid; background: #e3e3e3"|Date
| align="center" style="border-style: none none solid solid; background: #e3e3e3"|Location
| align="center" style="border-style: none none solid solid; background: #e3e3e3"|Notes
|-align=center
|Loss
|
|align=left| Kallie Knoetze
|KO
|5
|10 Sep 1977
|align=left| Ellis Park Tennis Stadium, Johannesburg, Gauteng, South Africa
|align=left|
|-
|Loss
|
|align=left| Joe Bugner
|KO
|1
|12 Oct 1976
|align=left| Empire Pool, Wembley, London, United Kingdom
|align=left|
|-
|Loss
|
|align=left| Muhammad Ali
|TKO
|5
|24 May 1976
|align=left| Olympiahalle, Munich, Germany
|align=left|
|-
|Win
|
|align=left| Bernd August
|TKO
|3
|6 Apr 1976
|align=left| Royal Albert Hall, Kensington, London, United Kingdom
|align=left|
|-
|Win
|
|align=left| Terry Krueger
|TKO
|3
|25 Nov 1975
|align=left| Royal Albert Hall, Kensington, London, United Kingdom
|align=left|
|-
|Win
|
|align=left| Danny McAlinden
|KO
|2
|4 Nov 1975
|align=left| Empire Pool, Wembley, London, United Kingdom
|align=left|
|-
|Win
|
|align=left| Bunny Johnson
|PTS
|15
|30 Sep 1975
|align=left| Empire Pool, Wembley, London, United Kingdom
|align=left|
|-
|Win
|
|align=left| Rocky Campbell
|TKO
|7
|7 May 1975
|align=left| Solihull Civic Hall, Solihull, West Midlands, United Kingdom
|align=left|
|-
|Win
|
|align=left| Neville Meade
|TKO
|4
|17 Feb 1975
|align=left| Grosvenor House, Mayfair, London, United Kingdom
|align=left|
|-
|Win
|
|align=left| Tim Wood
|PTS
|8
|9 Sep 1974
|align=left| Grosvenor House, Mayfair, London, United Kingdom
|align=left|
|-
|Loss
|
|align=left| Jose Manuel Urtain
|KO
|4
|22 May 1974
|align=left| Madrid, Spain
|align=left|
|-
|Loss
|
|align=left| Ngozika Ekwelum
|KO
|7
|11 Apr 1974
|align=left| Berlin, Germany
|align=left|
|-
|Loss
|
|align=left| Jimmy Young
|TKO
|8
|18 Feb 1974
|align=left| Mayfair Sporting Club, Mayfair, London, United Kingdom
|align=left|
|-
|Win
|
|align=left| Obie English
|TKO
|10
|14 Jan 1974
|align=left| Grosvenor House, Mayfair, London, United Kingdom
|align=left|
|-
|Loss
|
|align=left| Bunny Johnson
|KO
|10
|11 Oct 1973
|align=left| King's Hall, Manchester, United Kingdom
|align=left|
|-
|Win
|
|align=left| Larry Beilfuss
|TKO
|4
|9 Jul 1973
|align=left| Grosvenor House, Mayfair, London, United Kingdom
|align=left|
|-
|Win
|
|align=left| Billy Aird
|PTS
|10
|14 May 1973
|align=left| Grosvenor House, Mayfair, London, United Kingdom
|align=left|
|-
|Win
|
|align=left| Johnny Griffin
|KO
|3
|15 Mar 1973
|align=left| Grosvenor House, Mayfair, London, United Kingdom
|align=left|
|-
|Win
|
|align=left| Rufus Brassell
|DQ
|3
|13 Feb 1973
|align=left| Wolverhampton Civic Hall, Wolverhampton, United Kingdom
|align=left|
|-
|Win
|
|align=left| Roy Williams
|PTS
|8
|15 Jan 1973
|align=left| Grosvenor House, Mayfair, London, United Kingdom
|align=left|
|-
|Win
|
|align=left| Ray Patterson
|PTS
|8
|20 Nov 1972
|align=left| Grosvenor House, Mayfair, London, United Kingdom
|align=left|
|-
|Win
|
|align=left| Larry Renaud
|KO
|1
|16 Oct 1972
|align=left| Grosvenor House, Mayfair, London, United Kingdom
|align=left|
|-
|Win
|
|align=left| Roger Tighe
|PTS
|10
|21 Mar 1972
|align=left| Midland Hotel, Bradford, Yorkshire, United Kingdom
|align=left|
|-
|Win
|
|align=left| Ron Oliver
|KO
|1
|21 Feb 1972
|align=left| Mayfair Sporting Club, Mayfair, London, United Kingdom
|align=left|
|-
|Loss
|
|align=left| Rocky Campbell
|TKO
|1
|9 Dec 1971
|align=left| Wolverhampton Civic Hall, Wolverhampton, United Kingdom
|align=left|
|-
|Win
|
|align=left| Cliff Field
|TKO
|4
|24 Nov 1971
|align=left| Nottingham Ice Stadium, Nottingham, Nottinghamshire, United Kingdom
|align=left|
|-
|Win
|
|align=left| Carl Gizzi
|PTS
|8
|22 Sep 1971
|align=left| Solihull Civic Hall, Solihull, West Midlands, United Kingdom
|align=left|
|-
|Win
|
|align=left| Dennis Forbes
|PTS
|8
|22 Jun 1971
|align=left| Cafe Royal, Piccadilly, London, United Kingdom
|align=left|
|-
|Win
|
|align=left| Bunny Johnson
|PTS
|8
|13 Apr 1971
|align=left| Wolverhampton Civic Hall, Wolverhampton, United Kingdom
|align=left|
|-
|Win
|
|align=left| Brian Jewitt
|PTS
|8
|25 Jan 1971
|align=left| National Sporting Club, Piccadilly, London, United Kingdom
|align=left|
|-
|Win
|
|align=left| Dennis Forbes
|KO
|1
|14 Dec 1970
|align=left| National Sporting Club, Piccadilly, London, United Kingdom
|align=left|
|-
|Loss
|
|align=left| George Dulaire
|TKO
|1
|2 Nov 1970
|align=left| County Hotel, Bedford, Bedfordshire, United Kingdom
|align=left|
|-
|Loss
|
|align=left| Billy Aird
|TKO
|6
|7 Sep 1970
|align=left| Hotel Piccadilly, Manchester, United Kingdom
|align=left|
|-
|Win
|
|align=left| Obe Hepburn
|TKO
|5
|21 May 1970
|align=left| Anglo-American Sporting Club, Mayfair, London, United Kingdom
|align=left|
|-
|Win
|
|align=left| Billy Wynter
|PTS
|6
|4 May 1970
|align=left| Bedford, Bedfordshire, United Kingdom
|align=left|
|-
|Win
|
|align=left| Obe Hepburn
|PTS
|6
|31 Mar 1970
|align=left| York Hall, Bethnal Green, London, United Kingdom
|align=left|
|-
|Loss
|
|align=left| Billy Aird
|PTS
|8
|23 Feb 1970
|align=left| Grosvenor House, Mayfair, London, United Kingdom
|align=left|
|-
|Win
|
|align=left| Lloyd Walford
|PTS
|6
|25 Nov 1969
|align=left| Leeds Town Hall, Leeds, Yorkshire, United Kingdom
|align=left|
|-
|Win
|
|align=left| George Dulaire
|TKO
|2
|3 Nov 1969
|align=left| County Hotel, Bedford, Bedfordshire, United Kingdom
|align=left|
|-
|Win
|
|align=left| John Cullen
|PTS
|3
|3 Nov 1969
|align=left| County Hotel, Bedford, Bedfordshire, United Kingdom
|align=left|
|-
|Win
|
|align=left| Billy Aird
|PTS
|3
|3 Nov 1969
|align=left| County Hotel, Bedford, Bedfordshire, United Kingdom
|align=left|
|-
|Win
|
|align=left| Jack Cotes
|TKO
|3
|13 Oct 1969
|align=left| Nottingham Ice Stadium, Nottingham, Nottinghamshire, United Kingdom
|align=left|
|-
|Win
|
|align=left| Jack Cotes
|TKO
|2
|8 Sep 1969
|align=left| Hotel Piccadilly, Manchester, United Kingdom
|align=left|
|-
|Win
|
|align=left| Del Phillips
|PTS
|3
|7 Jul 1969
|align=left| Mayfair, London, United Kingdom
|align=left|
|-
|Loss
|
|align=left| Danny McAlinden
|KO
|1
|7 Jul 1969
|align=left| Mayfair, London, United Kingdom
|align=left|

References

External links

English male boxers
Heavyweight boxers
Sportspeople from Bradford
1945 births
Living people
European Boxing Union champions
Sportspeople from Halifax, West Yorkshire
Sportspeople from Scarborough, North Yorkshire
British Parachute Regiment soldiers
Military personnel from Yorkshire